Lawrence Scott is a writer.

Lawrence Scott or Laurence Scott may also refer to:

Laurence H. Scott (born 1896), World War I flying ace
Lawrence Scott (footballer)
Lawrence Scott (ice hockey)
Lawrence Scott (Quaker), part of A Quaker Action Group

See also
Laurie Scott (disambiguation)
Larry Scott (disambiguation)
Scott Lawrence (born 1963), U.S. actor
Scott Township, Lawrence County, Pennsylvania